Minerva House was built between 1979 and 1983 as the London office of Grindlays Bank with Twigg, Brown & Partners as architects. The yellow brick building features narrow windows between closely paired piers. It sits on the south bank of the River Thames just west of London Bridge.

History

The site

Cartographic sources show that the site has previously housed:
 The Close of the nearby Southwark Cathedral since the 14th century
Hibernia Wharf since at least 1888
New Hibernia Wharf since at least 1947

Sales

Minerva House was sold for around £42 million in 2005 and for £60 million in 2012.

Use

Owners
The current owners are Great Portland Estates with four office space tenants: Winckworth Sherwood LLP, TUI, Guy's and St Thomas' NHS Foundation Trust and Wandle Housing Association Ltd

References

Office buildings completed in 1983
Office buildings in the London Borough of Southwark